Baseri Hadi (also Romanized as Bāşerī Hādī; also known as Bāsīrī, Bāsīrī Hādī, Bāsīrī-ye Hādī, Bāsīrīyeh-ye Hādī, and Hādī) is a village in Dezhkord Rural District, Sedeh District, Eqlid County, Fars Province, Iran. At the 2006 census, its population was 248, in 46 families.

References 

Populated places in Eqlid County